The County of Dundas is one of the 37 counties of Victoria which are part of the cadastral divisions of Australia, used for land titles. The county is in the Western District of Victoria bounded by the Glenelg River in the west and north, by a line from Casterton to  Penshurst in the south, and by the eastern edge of the Grampians in the east.  Larger towns include Hamilton, Casterton and Coleraine. The county was proclaimed in 1849.

Parishes 
Parishes within the county:
 Balmoral 
Barnoolut
Beear 
Beerik 
Bepcha
Bil-Bil-Wyt 
Billiminah 
Bochara
Boreang East (part in the County of Borung)  
Boreang West (part in the County of Borung)
Brimboal  
Brim Brim 
Brit Brit
Bruk Bruk
Bulart 
Bullawin 
Carapook
Carrak 
Casterton (part in the County of Follett)
Cavendish
Coleraine 
Dewrang
Ganoo Ganoo
Gatum Gatum
Geerak
Gringegalgona 
Gritjurk 
Hilgray
Jalur
Jerrywarook 
Kanawalla
Karabeal
Karup Karup 
Kongbool
Koolomert
Konong Wootong
Lambruk 
Larneebunyah
Mirranatwa
Mokanger 
Mooralla
Mooree
Moorwinstowe
Mostyn
Moutajup
Muntham
Muryrtym
North Hamilton
Panyyabyr 
Pawbymbyr
Pendyk Pendyk 
Redruth
Tarrayoukyan
Toolang
Toolka
Urangara
Wando
Wanwandyra
Warrayure
Warrock
Wategat
Wing Wing (part in the County of Borung)
Woohlpooer  
Wookurkook 
Wytwalan
Yarramyljup
Youpayang

References

Research aids, Victoria 1910
Map of the counties of Follett, Dundas, Ripon, Normanby, Villiers, Hampden, Heytesbury / John Sands

Counties of Victoria (Australia)